Kapuram in the Telugu language means Married Life.

 Chelleli Kapuram is a 1971 Telugu film directed by K. Viswanath. 
 Kodalu Diddina Kapuram is a 1970 Telugu film directed by D. Yoganand. 
 Pandanti Kapuram is a 1972 Telugu film.